Rhochmopterum melanurum is a species of tephritid or fruit flies in the genus Rhochmopterum of the family Tephritidae.

Distribution
Philippines.

References

Tephritinae
Insects described in 1926
Taxa named by Mario Bezzi
Diptera of Asia